Jane Hirshfield (born February 24, 1953) is an American poet, essayist, and translator, known as 'one of American poetry's central spokespersons for the biosphere' and recognized as 'among the modern masters,' 'writing some of the most important poetry in the world today.' A 2019 elected member of the American Academy of Arts & Sciences, her books include numerous award-winning collections of her own poems, collections of essays, and edited and co-translated volumes of world writers from the deep past. Widely published in global newspapers and literary journals, her work has been translated into over fifteen languages.

Life, education, and work 
Jane Hirshfield was born on East 20th Street in New York City. She received her bachelor's degree in 1973 from Princeton University, in the school's first graduating class to include women as freshmen, and received lay ordination in Soto Zen at the San Francisco Zen Center in 1979.

Hirshfield's nine books of poetry have received numerous awards, including the California Book Award, the Poetry Center Book Award, and the Donald Hall-Jane Kenyon Award in American Poetry Her fifth book, Given Sugar, Given Salt, was a finalist for the National Book Critics Circle Award and her sixth collection, After, was shortlisted for the "T.S. Eliot Prize" (UK) and named a 'best book of 2006' by The Washington Post, the San Francisco Chronicle, and the Financial Times. Her eighth collection, The Beauty, was long-listed for the National Book Award and named a 'best book of 2015' by The San Francisco Chronicle. She has written two books of essays, Nine Gates: Entering the Mind of Poetry and Ten Windows: How Great Poems Transform the World. The Ink Dark Moon, her co-translation of the work of the two foremost women poets of classical-era Japan, was instrumental in bringing tanka (a 31-syllable Japanese poetic form) to the attention of American poets. She has edited four books collecting the work of poets from the past and is noted as being "part of a wave of important scholarship then seeking to recover the forgotten history of women writers." She received a Guggenheim Fellowship in 1985, the Academy of American Poets' 2004 Fellowship for Distinguished Achievement, and a National Endowment for the Arts fellowship in 2005.

Though never a full-time academic, Hirshfield has taught at the University of California, Berkeley, University of San Francisco, The Bennington Writing Seminars, and as the Elliston Visiting Poet at the University of Cincinnati. She was the Hellman Visiting Artist in 2013 in the Neuroscience Department at University of California, San Francisco, and Stanford University's 2016 Mohr Visiting Professor in Poetry. In 2022, she was the third Seamus Heaney International Visiting Poetry Fellow at Queen's University Belfast. She has also taught at many writers conferences, including Bread Loaf and the Napa Valley Writers Conference and has served as both core and associate faculty in the Bennington Master of Fine Arts Writing Seminars. Hirshfield appears frequently in literary festivals both in America and abroad, including the Geraldine R. Dodge Poetry Festival, the National Book Festival, the Los Angeles Times Festival of Books, Poetry International (London, UK), the China Poetry Festival (Xi'an, China), and the Second International Gathering of the Poets [Kraków, Poland]. She has received numerous residency fellowships, including from Yaddo, The MacDowell Colony, The Rauschenberg Foundation, the Rockefeller Foundation's Bellagio Center, Civitella Ranieri, and the Djerassi Resident Artists Program. She is also a contributing editor at The Alaska Quarterly Review and Ploughshares, a former guest editor of The Pushcart Prize Anthology and an advisory editor at Orion and Tricycle.

Hirshfield served as a chancellor of the Academy of American Poets (2012–2017).

In 2019, Hirshfield was elected to the American Academy of Arts & Sciences.

Poetry 
David Baker described Hirshfield  as "one of our finest, most memorable contemporary poets" and U.S. Poet Laureate Kay Ryan called Hirshfield  "a true person of letters". Hirshfield's poetry has often been described as sensuous, insightful, and clear. In the award citation for Hirshfield's 2004 Academy of American Poets' Fellowship, Rosanna Warren noted

Hirshfield has elaborated a sensuously philosophical art that imposes a pause in our fast-forward habits of mind. Her poems appear simple, and are not. Her language, in its cleanliness and transparency, poses riddles of a quietly metaphysical nature. Clause by clause, image by image, in language at once mysterious and commonplace, Hirshfield's poems clear a space for reflection and change. They invite ethical awareness, and establish a delicate balance.

The comment is echoed by the Polish Nobel Prize poet Czeslaw Milosz, who wrote, "A profound empathy for the suffering of all living beings... It is precisely this I praise in the poetry of Jane Hirshfield. The subject of her poetry is our ordinary life among other people and our continuing encounter with everything Earth brings us: trees, flowers, animals, and birds…In its highly sensuous detail, her poetry illuminates the Buddhist virtue of mindfulness."

Hirshfield's poetry reflects her immersion in a wide range of poetic traditions, both Asian and Western, interests found also in the essays of Nine Gates and Ten Windows. Polish, Scandinavian, and Eastern European poets have been particularly important to her, along with the poetry of Japan and China. Zbigniew Herbert's poem, "Pebble" stands as a model behind the small studies Hirshfield has labelled "pebbles", included in After and Come, Thief.

Hirshfield's work consistently explores themes of social justice and environmental awareness, specifically the belief that natural world and human world are inextricably linked. Mark A. Eaton noted in The Dictionary of Literary Biography that "Hirshfield's work recognizes the full breadth and responsibilities of humans' transactions with the earth, not just the intimacies." Donna Seaman, reviewing Hirshfield's ninth collection, Ledger, described Hirshfield's "carefully weighted tone as she reckons with our constant subtraction of Earth's life forces and incessant addition of carbon to our atmosphere, acid to our seas." Hirshfield has become an increasingly visible spokesperson for peace, justice, and environmental issues. In a review of her seventh collection,Come, Thief, Afaa M. Weaver wrote that her poems "find a middle ground between the larger landscape of political conflict and the personal landscape of our need to connect with one another." Hirshfield's voice as a spokesperson for peace, justice, and environmental issues has become increasing visible, with her work concluding the Library of America's "War No More: Three Hundred Years of American Antiwar and Peace Writing" and appearing in many other collections of poems of social awareness.

An article in Critical Survey of Poetry (2002) summarized the effect of Zen on Hirshfield's work:

Little of her poetry is political in the usual sense of direct comment on specific issues, but all her work is political in the sense of integrating the stirrings of the heart, with the political realities that surround all people. Undoubtedly, the source for these characteristics of her poetry, and for her very concept of what poetry is, "the magnification of being," derives from her strong Zen Buddhist training. Her emphasis on compassion, on the preexistent unity of subject and object, on nature, on the self-sufficient suchness of being, and on the daunting challenge of accepting transitoriness, as Peter Harris notes, are central themes in her poetry derived from Buddhism. Hirshfield does not, however, burden her poetry with heavy, overt Zen attitudes. Only occasionally is there any direct reference.

While many reviewers mention, even make central, Hirshfield's Buddhism as the prevailing filter of her work, Hirshfield has expressed frustration in multiple interviews with being so labeled. "I always feel a slight dismay if I'm called a "Zen" poet. I am not. I am a human poet, that's all." Lisa Russ Spaar has called Hirshfield "a visionary", continuing: "It is arguable that the riddle, the existential joke of being, of meaning, of Dickinson's "prank of the Heart at play on the Heart," is as powerful a source as song for the lyric poem. Central to Hirshfield's vision is a kind of holy delight that is at the heart of riddles and koans".

Other reviewers note the investigative nature of Hirshfield's poems, in which life is approached as a puzzle which is not quite solvable. In a review of Come, Thief in The Georgia Review, Judith Kitchen wrote "Jane Hirshfield's felt longing elevates description to insight: not self-knowledge, less fleeting than that... something more encompassing, more akin to the indefinable suddenly given expression."

For all her focus on insight and the unknowable, as early as 1995, Stephen Yenser noted in The Yale Review Hirshfield's interest in the empirical. "The probably unspeakeable plenitude of the empirical world: Jane Hirshfield's poems recognize it at every point." In a Booklist starred review, Donna Seaman has more recently noted Hirshfield's "meticulous reasoning, including a striking meditation on the paradoxical richness of spareness that can serve as her ars poetica."

Hirshfield's poems and life increasingly reflect her long-standing interest in biology, as well as physics and other fields of science. She was the 2013 Hellman Visiting Artist in the Neuroscience department at The University of California, San Francisco, a program "created to foster dialogue between scientists, caregivers, patients, clinicians and the public regarding creativity and the brain." In 2010, she was the Blue River Fellow in the H.J. Andrews Experimental Forest's Long Term Ecological Reflection project, whose goal is to track scientific research and artistic responses to the same sites for 200 years.

In 2017, Hirshfield organized a Poets For Science component for the main D.C. March for Science held on Earth Day, April 22, on the Washington Mall. As a main rally speaker, she read "On the Fifth Day", a poem protesting the January 24, 2017, removal of scientific information from federal agency websites. The poem appeared on the front page of the Washington Post's Opinion Section a week before the March. Working with the Wick Poetry Center based at Kent State University in Ohio, Hirshfield arranged also for a Poets For Science tent to be part of the teach-in preceding the March, in which scientists and their supporters were invited both to read and to write their own scientifically-grounded poems. Poets For Science activities from the March and into the future are hosted on the Wick Poetry Center's website. Video of Hirshfield's reading at the March for Science.

While her work looks deeply at the inner world of the self and emotions, Hirshfield has kept most of the details of her private life out of both her poems and her public life as a poet, preferring that her work stand on its own.

Hirshfield's work has been published in The New Yorker, Atlantic Monthly, The Nation, the Los Angeles Times, the Times Literary Supplement, the New York Times, many literary journals, and multiple volumes of The Best American Poetry and Pushcart Prize anthologies. Her poems have frequently been read on various National Public Radio programs, and she was featured in two Bill Moyers PBS television specials, The Sounds of Poetry and Fooling With Words. An interview with Hirshfield on the occasion of the publication of "The Beauty" and "Ten Windows" in March 2015 was published in SF Gate. Extended conversations with fellow poets Ilya Kaminsky (The Paris Review), Kaveh Akbar (The American Poetry Review), and Mark Doty (Guernica) appeared in conjunction with the publication of Ledger in 2020.

Bibliography

Poetry 

Collections
 
 
 The October Palace (HarperCollins, 1994), winner of the Poetry Center Book Award
 The Lives of the Heart (HarperCollins,1997), winner of the Bay Area Book Reviewers Award
 Given Sugar, Given Salt (HarperCollins, 2001), finalist for the National Book Critics Circle Award
 Pebbles & Assays (Brooding Heron Press), 2004
Each Happiness Ringed by Lions (Bloodaxe Books UK, 2005)
 After (HarperCollins, 2006), (Bloodaxe Books UK, 2006)
 
minus/my-ness (Missing Links Press), 2014. .
 
 

List of poems

Non-fiction 

 The Heart of Haiku (Kindle Single, 2011) 
 
———————
Notes

Honors and awards 
 The Poetry Center Book Award
 The California Book Award
 Fellowship, Guggenheim Foundation
 Fellowship, Rockefeller Foundation,
 Fellowship, Academy of American Poets
 Fellowship, National Endowment for the Arts
 Donald Hall-Jane Kenyon Prize in American Poetry
 Columbia University's Translation Center Award
 Commonwealth Club of California Poetry Medal
 Bay Area Book Reviewers Award
 Academy Fellowship for distinguished poetic achievement from The Academy of American Poets (2004)
 Finalist, T. S. Eliot Prize
 Finalist, National Book Critics Circle Award
 Long-list National Book Award
 Chancellor of the Academy of American Poets (2012–2017)
 elected, American Academy of Arts & Sciences (2019)

References

External links 

 Profile at Poetry Archive
 Profile at Poetry Foundation
 Hirshfield on Poetry Everywhere, reading For What Binds Us at the Geraldine R. Dodge festival (video; 2:17)
 Jane Hirshfield reading from new work at the 2010 Key West Literary Seminar (audio; 16:09)
 Jane Hirshfield's Web pages at the Steven Barclay Agency Web site
 Jane Hirshfield's poems  at Slate
 Jane Hirshfield's poems in The New Yorker
Jane Hirshfield's poems in The Atlantic
Jane Hirshfield's essay, "Justice: Four Windows" in the Virginia Quarterly Review
 Best American Poetry interview on the publication of Come Thief, "A Conversation with Brian Bouldrey" Part 1, part 2, part 3
 Hirshfield's interview and reading at the Scottish Poetry Library,spring, 2012
 "Why Write Poetry?" (with Jane Haupt) in Psychology Today, January 2014
 Hirshfield's interview with Kaveh Akbar in "Divedapper", March 21, 2016

Living people
1953 births

Princeton University alumni
University of California, Berkeley College of Letters and Science faculty
University of San Francisco faculty
University of Cincinnati faculty
MacDowell Colony fellows
National Endowment for the Arts Fellows

Poets from California 
20th-century American essayists
American women essayists
American women poets
American literary editors
The New Yorker people
20th-century American poets
20th-century American women writers
20th-century American translators
21st-century American essayists
21st-century American poets
21st-century American women writers
21st-century American translators
Poets from New York (state)
Writers from New York City
American Buddhists
American women academics